Boda is an upazila of Panchagarh District in the Division of Rangpur, Bangladesh. Boda is the largest upazila in Panchagarh. It is named Boda because the big Bordeshwari Temple is there.

Geography
It has 33535 households and total area 349.47 km2.

Demographics
As of the 1991 Bangladesh census, Boda has a population of 168258. Males constitute 51.22% of the population, and females 48.78%. This Upazila's eighteen up population is 83118. Boda has an average literacy rate of 29.4% (7+ years), and the national average of 32.4% literate.

Administration
Boda Upazila is divided into Boda Municipality and ten union parishads: Benghari Banagram, Boda, Boroshoshi, Chandanbari, Jholaishal Shiri, Kajoldighi Kaligonj, Marea Bamonhat, Moidan Dighi, Pachpir, and Sakoa. The union parishads are subdivided into 174 mauzas and 219 villages.

Boda Municipality is subdivided into 9 wards and 32 mahallas.

See also
 Upazilas of Bangladesh
 Districts of Bangladesh
 Divisions of Bangladesh

References

Upazilas of Panchagarh District